Richard Oliver Faulkner, Baron Faulkner of Worcester (born 22 March 1946) is a Labour Party politician and life peer.

Biography
Faulkner was born on 22 March 1946 in Manchester, England. He was educated at the Merchant Taylors' School, Northwood, an all-boys private school. He studied philosophy, politics and economics (PPE) at Worcester College, Oxford. He worked as a researcher and journalist for the Labour Party since when he has been active in politics. He served as a councillor in the London borough of Merton from 1971 to 1974. He was an unpaid communications advisor to the Leader of the Labour Party in the 1987, 1992 and 1997 general elections.

He contested Devizes for the Labour Party in the 1970 election and then again in February 1974 election. He contested Monmouth for the Labour Party in the October 1974 election and Huddersfield West for the Labour Party in the 1979 election.

He was raised to the peerage in 1999, as Baron Faulkner of Worcester, of Wimbledon in the London Borough of Merton. He has served on a number of parliamentary committees, and lists his political interests as transport, sport, human rights, smoking and health, and sex equality.   He is Vice Chair of the All-Party Parliamentary Group on Industrial Heritage. He is the UK trade envoy to Taiwan. Lord Faulkner chairs the Alderney Gambling Control Commission.

Lord Faulkner is married to Susan (née Heyes), with whom he has two daughters. His brother was the civil servant David Faulkner.

Books and publications
 Faulkner, R. and Austin, C. (2012). Holding the Line: How Britain's Railways Were Saved. Oxford Publishing Company
 Faulkner, R. and Austin, C. (2015). Disconnected! Broken Links in Britain's Rail Policy. Oxford Publishing Company

References

External links
Lord Faulkner Website

1946 births
Living people
Faulkner of Worcester, Richard Faulkner, Baron
People educated at Merchant Taylors' School, Northwood
Alumni of Worcester College, Oxford
Labour Party (UK) parliamentary candidates
Life peers created by Elizabeth II